Myanma Posts and Telecommunications (abbreviated MPT) is a state-owned enterprise in Myanmar under the supervision of the Ministry of Transport and Communications. MPT operates the country's postal system. The Myanmar Postal Service now runs over 1,000 post offices throughout the country. Local Express Myanmar Postal Parcel Service was introduced in Yangon and Mandalay on 1 April 1992 and its services are now extended to over 120  townships. Until 2013, MPT was also Myanmar's only telecommunications operator.

Telecommunications

Myanmar Posts and Telecommunications (MPT) is the first and leading telecommunications operator in Myanmar and has been championing the development of the telecommunications industry since its foundation in 1884. It provides both fixed and mobile telecommunication services to people and enterprises, including a nationwide 3G network and MIMO 4X4 powered data service known as LTE+.

In January 2017, mobile operator KDDI appointed Toshitake Amamiya as the new CEO of MPT, replacing Takashi Nagashima, who was CEO since July 2014. Amamiya was previously head of KDDI's global business division.

Joint operations 
In July 2014, MPT, the incumbent telecom operator in Myanmar, signed a Joint Operations Agreement with KSGM, whose ultimate ownership is held by KDDI Corporation (KDDI) & Sumitomo Corporation (Sumitomo).

Together, KDDI and Sumitomo have committed to invest over $2 billion to accelerate the development of MPT and Myanmar's telecommunications industry. This commitment is among the largest historical Japanese investments in the country.

See also

 Internet in Myanmar
 Telecommunications in Myanmar
Ooredoo Myanmar
Telenor Myanmar
Mytel

References

Communications in Myanmar
Telecommunications companies of Myanmar
Government agencies of Myanmar